Borchers is a surname. Notable people with the surname include:

 Adolf Borchers (1913–1996), fighter ace
 A. Webber Borchers (1906-1989), American politician and businessman
 Bobby Borchers (born 1952), singer
 Charles M. Borchers (1869–1946), politician
 Charles Robert Borchers (1943-1997), lawyer and politician
 Cornell Borchers (1925-2014), German actress
 George Borchers (1869–1938), baseball pitcher
 Hans-Jürgen Borchers (born 1926), mathematical physicist
 Karen T. Borchers (born 1957), photojournalist
 Nat Borchers (born 1981), soccer player
 Ronny Borchers (born 1957), footballer
 Walter Borchers (1916–1945), German flying ace

See also
 Bill Borcher (died 2003), basketball coach
 Borchers algebra

German-language surnames